Marginella britoi is a species of sea snail, a marine gastropod mollusc in the family Marginellidae, the marginellids.

Description
The length of the shell attains 12.2 mm.

Distribution
This marine species occurs endemic to São Tomé and Príncipe Islands, Gulf of Guinea, Central Africa.

References

External links
 Marginellidae at Gastropods.com

britoi
Endemic fauna of São Tomé and Príncipe
Invertebrates of São Tomé and Príncipe
Gastropods described in 2014